André Guesdon (14 October 1948 – 14 September 2020) was a French professional football defender.

He was part of SC Bastia team that reached 1978 UEFA Cup Final.

Guesdon died on 14 September 2020, aged 71.

References

External links
 
 
 Profile
 Profile

1948 births
2020 deaths
French footballers
Association football defenders
Stade Malherbe Caen players
AS Monaco FC players
SC Bastia players
FC Girondins de Bordeaux players
OGC Nice players
Ligue 1 players
French football managers
Angers SCO managers
Stade Brestois 29 managers